A number of sportspeople eligible for the  2020 Summer Paralympics in Tokyo stated that they would not attend because of the COVID-19 pandemic in Japan.

Four Pacific nations were unable to attend the games due to COVID-19 related travel restrictions in Australia, which would have required the athletes to quarantine there at their own cost, which the National Paralympic Committees were unable to afford.

List

Qualified but withdrew due to COVID-19 concerns

Qualified but withdrew due to testing positive for COVID-19

Other Paralympians tested positive for COVID-19 whose identities were not disclosed. A total of 13 athletes in Japan have reportedly tested positive for COVID-19.

See also
List of athletes not attending the 2020 Summer Olympics due to COVID-19 concerns
List of athletes not attending the 2022 Winter Olympics due to COVID-19 concerns

References